Telus Corporation (also shortened and referred to as Telus Corp.) is a Canadian multinational publicly traded holding company and conglomerate, headquartered in Vancouver, BC, which is the parent company of subsidiaries—Telus Communications, Telus Mobility, Telus Health, Telus Agriculture and Telus International. Telus offers a range of telecommunications, health, safety, and security products and services.  It is listed with the Toronto Stock Exchange (TSX: T).  Telus Communications Inc. offers telephony, television, data and Internet services; Telus Mobility, offers wireless services; Telus Health operates companies that provide health products and services; and Telus International operates worldwide, providing multilingual customer service outsourcing and digital IT services.

Overview

Telus Corporation is the parent company of Telus Communications, Telus Mobility, Telus Health, and Telus International. Telus Health, which was formerly known as Emergis, an e-Business was acquired by Telus Corporation in 2007 for $763 million. Telus Health was divided into three segments—'Telus Health Solutions, Telus Assyst Real Estate, and Telus Financial Solutions.

Inception

The Alberta Government Telephones (AGT), had served as the major telephone provider for the province of Alberta from 1906—when it was first established by the Liberal Party of Alberta under the tenure of then Premier of Alberta, Alexander Cameron Rutherford, until the 1990s—when then Premier Don Getty began the privatization process.  NovaTel's liabilities eventually cost the government more than $600 million. The initial public offering of the newly established Telus' shares, represented the largest in Canadian history up to this time. The following year the provincial government divested its remaining ownership interest in TELUS for $870 million. By 1996, the former brand names, ED TEL and AGT had been retired. All Telus products and companies adopted the TELUS brand name.

Telus merged with British Columbia Telephone Company (BC Tel) in 1999, with the merged company keeping the TELUS brand name. The headquarters of BC Tel in Burnaby, BC became the headquarters of the merged Telus Corporation, and the company moved its corporate headquarters to Vancouver after completion of the Telus Garden complex.

Subsidiaries

TELUS Communications 

TELUS Corporation's principal subsidiary is the wholly owned Telus Communications Inc. Only serving customers in Canada, services include data, internet, voice, TV subscriptions, and wireless services. It also has mobile phones, tablets, and smart watches.https://www.bloomberg.com/profile/company/1565Z:CN?leadSource=uverify%20wall Telus Communications merged its mobility and home service divisions in the year 2023 to create Telus Consumer Solutions.https://www.bnnbloomberg.ca/telus-combines-mobility-and-home-service-to-create-new-business-unit-1.1874108

TELUS Health

In the summer of 2018, Telus acquired a "chain of medical clinics" for over $100 million. Telus also spent more than "$2 billion on digital health ventures." This included purchasing the "electronic medical record software" used by half of Canada's doctors. By March 2019,  Telus had "become the biggest health-care information technology company in Canada". Telus has also partnered with the UK-based software developer and operator, Babylon, to launch a Telus Health app in Canada—digital chatbot capable of checking symptoms— in a cost and revenue sharing initiative.

TELUS International 
Telus International is the global arm of Telus Corporation, providing global contact center and business process outsourcing services to corporations in the financial services, consumer electronics and gaming, telecommunications, energy and utilities industries.

Telus International has contact centers in the Philippines, the United Kingdom, Central America (Guatemala and El Salvador), and Eastern Europe (Bulgaria and Romania), where it is known as Telus International Europe.

Finances 
For the fiscal year 2019, Telus Corporation reported earnings of CA$5.554 billion, with an annual revenue of CA$14.658 billion, an increase of 8.8% over the previous fiscal year. Telus Corp operates the largest telecommunications company (Telus Communications Inc.) in Western Canada and the second largest in Canada.

Corporate governance 
According to  Yahoo Finance, Telus Corporation received an Institutional Shareholder Services (ISS) governance risk score of 5 out of 10, as of 3 December 2019.

Board of directors 
The current board of directors as of September 2022

R.H. (Dick) Auchinleck, the Chairman of Telus Corporation's board of directors, has been lead director since 2014, when Brian Canfield stepped down. Auchinleck, who has served on the Telus board since c. 2004, had previously been CEO at Gulf Canada Resources.

 Darren Entwistle, President and CEO
 Hazel Claxton, Audit Committee, Human Resources and Compensation Committee
 Kathy Kinloch, Corporate Governance Committee, Human Resources and Compensation Committee
 David Mowat, Chair of the Audit Committee
 Raymond T. Chan, Pension Committee, Human Resources and Compensation Committee
 Tom Flynn, Audit Committee, Pension Committee
 Christine Magee, Human Resources and Compensation Committee, Pension Committee
 Marc Parent, Pension Committee, Human Resources and Compensation Committee
 Lisa de Wilde, Chair of the Corporate Governance Committee, Pension Committee
 Mary Jo Haddad, Chair of the Human Resources and Compensation Committee, Corporate Governance Committee
 John Manley, Corporate Governance Committee, Human Resources and Compensation Committee
 Denise Pickett, Audit Committee, Corporate Governance Committee
 W. Sean Willy, Audit Committee, Corporate Governance Committee
 Victor Dodig, Director

Executive team 
The current executive teams as of September 2022

 Darren Entwistle, President and CEO
 Doug French, Executive Vice-President and Chief Financial Officer
 Navin Arora, Executive Vice-President, Business Solutions
 Tony Geheran, Executive Vice-President and Chief Customer Officer
 Zainul Mawji, President, Home Solutions
 Sandy McIntosh, Executive Vice-President, People and Culture and Chief Human Resources Officer
 Jeff Puritt, Executive Vice-President and TELUS International President and CEO
 Jill Schnarr, Chief Communications Officer
 Jim Senko, Executive Vice-President, Mobility Solutions
 John Raines, President, TELUS Agriculture
 Michael Dingle, Chief Operating Officer, TELUS Health
 Andrea Wood, Chief Legal and Governance Officer

See also
History of Telus

References

External links 
 

Telus
Canadian brands
Holding companies of Canada
Information technology companies of Canada
Mass media companies of Canada
Telecommunications companies of Canada
Multinational companies headquartered in Canada
Conglomerate companies of Canada
Corporate spin-offs
Canadian companies established in 1990
Holding companies established in 1990
Mass media companies established in 1990
Telecommunications companies established in 1990
S&P/TSX 60
Companies listed on the Toronto Stock Exchange
Companies based in Vancouver